A Token of the Wreckage is the third studio album and fourth overall release by American independent singer Megan Slankard, released on March 8, 2011.

Track listing
 "A Token of the Wreckage" (Slankard) – 5:19
 "Fair Enough and Farewell" (Slankard, Blau)  – 4:00
 "Our Little Secret" (Slankard, Symonds)  – 3:24
 "The Tragic Life of Caleb" (Slankard) – 3:40
 "My Obsession with Bees" (Slankard) – 3:31
 "The Happy Birthday" (Slankard) – 3:21
 "The Pain of Growing Up" (Slankard) – 3:56
 "Soundtrack" (Slankard) – 2:47
 "Beautiful Makeshift" (Slankard) – 4:17
 "The Last Thing You Say" (Slankard) – 3:58
 "You and Your Bright Ideas" (Slankard) – 4:16
 "Show Up" (Slankard) – 5:11

Release and promotion
In the summer of 2010, Slankard posted on her official website asking for donation from fans to fund the recording of her first music video.  It was revealed that the video would be for the lead single of her album, the title track "A Token of the Wreckage".  The video was recorded in September 2010 in San Rafael, CA directed by Matthew Ward.  It was officially released on November 30, 2010.

Slankard is on a concert tour of the United States to promote the release of her album, which began with an album release party held on March 5, 2011 in San Francisco, CA.

Personnel
 Danny Blau – rhythm guitar, keyboard
 Kyle Capistra – drums, percussion, background vocals
 James Deprato – electric guitar
 Jeff Symonds – bass

References

External links
 [ Allmusic: A Token of the Wreckage album page]
 Official Music Video page for "A Token of the Wreckage"

2011 albums
Megan Slankard albums